Tavakkoli (Persian: توكلي‎‎) may refer to

Tavakkoli (surname)
Hasanabad-e Tavakkoli, a village in Iran

See also
 Tavakkol (disambiguation)